Rick Allison (real name: Éric Vleminckx, born July 17, 1964, in Brussels) is a Belgian-born Canadian singer, author and  record producer.

Biography

In 1990, Allison met singer Lara Fabian in a piano-bar in Brussels. They started writing their first songs together and went to Montréal in 1991 to work on Fabian's first album. This record came out in 1991 in Canada and was a huge commercial success. Allison produced Fabian's following francophone albums Carpe Diem, Pure and Nue, all of which performed very well and spawned several hit singles in Canada and French-speaking Europe. He also worked on her first English-language album Lara Fabian.

For the Eurovision Song Contest in 2002, Allison wrote the music for the French entry, "Il faut du temps" by Sandrine François. That same year, he contributed three songs on Johnny Hallyday's album À la vie, à la mort, including the single Pense à moi.

Allison had another major success when he produced Chimène Badi's debut album Entre nous in 2003. The single of the same name topped the French Singles Chart. Later on he worked with other young female singers, including Nolwenn Leroy, Julie Zenatti and Élodie Frégé.

In 2004, Allison and Fabian, who had been a couple in real life, broke up and also ended their professional relationship. This was followed by a series of legal battles over the use of the copyright of Fabian's songs. Allison also contributed five songs to Chimène Badi's hit album Dis-moi que tu m'aimes and worked on two songs Michel Sardou's album Du plaisir.

Since, he has composed songs for several French and French-Canadian singers such as Gino Quilico, Vincent Niclo, Marc-André Fortin, Suzie Villeneuve and Magalie Vaé, for whom he produced the album Magalie in 2006.

In 2004, Allison won the International Achievement Award with co-writer Lara Fabian at the Francophone SOCAN Awards in Montreal.

 1991: l'album éponyme of Lara Fabian released by Allison along with single Qui pense à l'amour?
 1993: Écris moi and Quelle heure est-il à Montréal in the album Pourquoi tu pars of Nancy Martinez
 1995: Album Carpe Diem of Lara Fabian released by Allison
 1996: Album Pure of Lara Fabian released by Allison along with singles Tout, Humana, Je t'aime, Si tu m’aimes and La différence
 1998: Album Prends-moi of Patrick Fiori released by Allison along with singles Elle est and J’en ai mis du temps
 1999: Single De la peau for Sandy Valentino, written with Lara Fabian
 1999: Album Lara Fabian Live
 1999: Album Chaque feu of Roch Voisine along with the single Et si
 2001: Album Nue of Lara Fabian released by Allison along with the singles J'y crois encore, Immortelle, Aimer déjà et Tu es mon autre
 2001: Duo Et maintenant by Lara Fabian and Florent Pagny for the album 2 of the last 
 2002: Music for the song  Il faut du temps of Sandrine François, in collaboration with Patrick Bruel ( which has been the song for the contestant from France for the Eurovision song contest)
 2002: Single Le jour J for Thibault Durand
 2002: Six songs for the album Ange et étrange of Élisa Tovati including the music for the single J'avance (in collaboration with Pierre Ruben)
 2002: Three songs for the album À la vie, à la mort of Johnny Hallyday including the single Pense à moi
 2003: Single Quelque chose pour quelqu’un of Damien Sargue
 2003: Album Entre nous for Chimène Badi along with singles Entre nous and Si j'avais su t'aimer
 2003: Song Inévitablement for Nolwenn Leroy in her album Nolwenn
 2003: His own album Je suis un autre by Rick Allison
 2004: Five songs in the album A Wonderful Life of Lara Fabian
 2004: Song Moins de toi d'Élodie Frégé in her album éponyme
 2004: Song L'âge que j'ai for Julie Zenatti in her album Comme vous
 2004: Song Dis-moi moi pourquoi d'Audrey de Montigny in his album Audrey
 2004: Songs La vie, la mort, etc. and J'aurais voulu t'aimer in the album Du plaisir of Michel Sardou
 2004: Five songs in the album Dis-moi que tu m'aimes of Chimène Badi
 2004: Album Un jour, une nuit of Gino Quilico
 2005: Songs En toi and Si je te parle de moi in the album Non négociable of Marie Chantal Toupin
 2006: Album Magalie of Magalie Vaé with the single Je ne suis qu'une chanson
 2006: Ten songs for the album Un nom sur mon visage of Vincent Niclo
 2006: Song Je reviens sur terre in the album Mon cœur est une pomme of Ariane Gauthier
 2007: Song Je demande à la vie in the eponymous album of Marc-André Fortin
 2008: Eight songs for the eponymous album of Suzie Villeneuve
 2010: He releases the album Hit's Amore of Vincenzo Thoma also with the clip "Careless Whisper"
 2012: His album "De l'interieur" includes his compositions which are more intimate 
 2014: He writes lyrics for the song "Le vent et le cri" on the music of Ennio Morricone performed by Romina Arena
 2015: Producing and writing in collaboration the album of Lola Dargenti released in Canada in April, the single "La libertad" went into Top 5 
 2015: Released the single of Étienne Drapeau "Eres mi reina"
 2016: He produce and writes two songs for the best-of by Marie-Chantal Toupin, "Merci" and "Derrière soi"
 2017: He release the album "Una Via" of the Corsican band I Messageri in Bastia in the studio which he managed in the house he was staying in, instant success!
 2017: He produces and writes the album of Fabrizio Zeva, Italo-belgian artist
 2017: He produces and writes in collaboration an EP for the american artist, born in Ukraine Dina Layzis
 2017: Starts the writing for the musical comedy "RISE" in collaboration with Thierry Sforza
 2018: Song "L'âge que j'ai" with Didier Golemanas in reprise in the album of Petula Clark
 2018: He released the song "Comme une évidence" for the duo Lynda Lemay and Jean-Charles Wery
 2018: He released several songs for the new album of Ginette Reno

References

External links 
 Site officiel
 Site officiel

1964 births
Belgian people of Russian descent
Belgian people of Irish descent
Belgian pop singers
Musicians from Brussels
Belgian emigrants to Canada
Living people